The Yew Mountains are a mountain ridge in Southern West Virginia that locally forms the boundary between the Allegheny Plateau to the northwest and the Ridge-and-Valley Appalachians to the southeast. It is part of the Allegheny Mountains, and contains some of the highest peaks in West Virginia. Other peaks include Black Mountain, Jacox Knob, Briery Knob, and Blue Knob. The Cranberry Wilderness of Monongahela National Forest, and the Yew Mountain Center, are within the range. There is a proposal to create a Birthplace of Rivers National Monument in the area.

To the southeast, it descends steeply to the Greenbrier River valley, while to the northwest it descends more slowly within the watershed of the Gauley River.  At its northeastern end, the uppermost course of the Elk River separates it from the Shavers Fork Mountain Complex, specifically Cheat Mountain and Back Allegheny Mountain.  Beyond its southwestern end lies the New River Gorge and eventually Flat Top Mountain, which continues the Allegheny Plateau/Ridge-and-Valley border.

References 

Mountains of West Virginia